Le Sabre de mon père is a surrealist play by Roger Vitrac which premiered at Théâtre de Paris in 1951.

Original cast 
 Mise-en-scène: Pierre Dux
 Settings: Félix Labisse
 Costumes: Rosine Delamare
 Roles and interpreters:
 Françoise Dujardin: Sophie Desmarets
 Édouard Dujardin: Pierre Dux
 Pierre Martignac: Max Palenc
 Adélaïde Poinsot: Claire Gérard
 Boussu: Noël Roquevert
 Albert Feuillade: Jean Lagache
 Docteur Laborderie: Charles Dechamps
 Nini: Anne Vitrac
 Clémence: Luce Clament
 Simon: Serge Lecointe
 Flore Médard: Marcelle Arnold
 Diane Condé: Geneviève Berney
 Popaul: Jean-Jacques Duverger
 Isabelle Laborderie: Janine Liezer
 Pierril: René Génin

Critics  

Initially the play was unsuccessful and disliked by critics, even by those who were at the time supporting surrealist arts of this kind. Some of those critics said that the title was not explicit as they had wished.

The play was defended by Jean Anouilh: "We are some in the art who have been working since the last war to strangle the anecdote, to kill the idea of a good play that ruled the French theater [...] to the point of reducing it to the status of a mummy. [...] The play is good, no? Well, no. Neither Colombe nor Le Sabre are good plays. But if the actors play "like gods", it's because they have characters otherwise, they don't play well. [...] And then, let architecture to the construction specialists. The theater is a game of the mind and mind may well make honey in foraging in detail, like a bee."
This critic echoes Robert Kemp's article: "That Sabre, good in details and which, taken line by line, do not lack of taste but is on the whole after all insignificant..."

External links 
 Henri Béhar, "Vitrac, théâtre ouvert sur le rêve" 

French plays
1951 plays